The women's 100 metres at the 2022 World Athletics Championships was held at the Hayward Field in Eugene, Oregon, U.S. on 16 and 17 July 2022.

Summary
As she has done for most of the previous 13 years Shelly-Ann Fraser-Pryce was off to a fast start, with Marie-Josée Ta Lou also out fast. By 30 metres, only Shericka Jackson was still close, Ta Lou fading to join a line across the track made up of Dina Asher-Smith, Mujinga Kambundji and two time Olympic Champion Elaine Thompson-Herah.  Fraser-Pryce continued to open up space until about 20 metres out when Jackson was able to make a little headway on the sizable lead, but it was too little, too late.  Thompson-Herah edged ahead of Asher-Smith to take bronze. With seven women going sub-11 seconds, this was the fastest 100m final in the World Championships history.

Just as in the Olympics, the same three athletes from Jamaica swept the medals, but in a different order.  Now 35 years old, Fraser-Pryce equalled her own Masters World Record with a 10.67, while claiming an unprecedented fifth World Championship in the same event.

Records
Before the competition records were as follows:

Qualification standard
The standard to qualify automatically for entry was 11.15.

Schedule
The event schedule, in local time (UTC−7), was as follows:

Results

Heats 

The first 3 athletes in each heat (Q) and the next 3 fastest (q) qualify to the semi-finals.

Wind:Heat 1: +0.7 m/s, Heat 2: -0.2 m/s, Heat 3: +0.2 m/s, Heat 4: +0.8 m/s, Heat 5: +1.2 m/s, Heat 6: +0.1 m/s, Heat 7: -0.1 m/s

Semi-finals 
The semi-finals started on 17 July at 17:33.

Wind:Heat 1: -0.2 m/s, Heat 2: -0.2 m/s, Heat 3: +0.4 m/s

Final 
The final started on 17 July at 19:50.

Wind: +0.8 m/s

References

100
100 metres at the World Athletics Championships